Allen Doone (Edward Allen) (3 Sep 1878 – 4 May 1948) was an American tenor and comic actor who specialised in Irish romantic dramas. Doone was born in Amboy, Illinois, to Irish immigrants Kate and James Allen.

From 1909 to 1938, Allen had his own theatre company in Australia. He moved back to the USA where he died.

He starred in the feature film The Rebel (1915).

Select theatre credits
The Rebel (1913)
The Wearing of the Green (1914)
Lucky O'Shea (1924)
Sweet County Kerry
Parish Priest
In Old Donegal
Molly Bawa

References

External links

1878 births
1948 deaths
American tenors
20th-century American male actors
People from Amboy, Illinois
American male stage actors